Hartfield House is a military installation in Dumbarton, Scotland.

History
The house was built for William Baird, the Procurator fiscal of Dunbartonshire, in 1853. It passed to Andrew McGaan in 1863 and to Colonel John Denny in 1883. In the early 19th century it became the headquarters of the 9th (Dunbartonshire) Battalion, Princess Louise's (Argyll and Sutherland Highlanders). The battalion was mobilised at the drill hall in August 1914 before being deployed to the Western Front.
 
The 9th Battalion was disbanded in 1938. However B Company, 3rd (Territorial) Battalion, The Argyll and Sutherland Highlanders (Princess Louise's) was formed at Dumbarton in 1967. Following a re-organisation, this unit evolved to become D (The Argyll and Sutherland Highlanders) Company, 1st Battalion, 51st Highland Volunteers based at Dumbarton in 1971, D (Argyll and Sutherland Highlanders) Company, 51st Highland Regiment in 1999 and D Company, 51st Highland, 7th Battalion Royal Regiment of Scotland in 2006.

References

Drill halls in Scotland
Buildings and structures in West Dunbartonshire